Hans von Friebeis was a mayor of Vienna.

References 

Mayors of Vienna
19th-century Austrian people
Year of birth missing
Year of death missing